Bethanie Mattek-Sands and Sania Mirza were the defending champions, but Mattek-Sands chose not to participate.  Mirza played alongside Cara Black, but lost to Andrea Hlaváčková and Lucie Šafářová in the first round.
Alla Kudryavtseva and Anastasia Rodionova won the title, defeating Raquel Kops-Jones and Abigail Spears in the final, 6–2, 5–7, [10–8].

Seeds

Draw

Draw

References
Main Draw

Dubai Tennis Championships - Doubles
Women's Doubles